Nekkhomang Neihsial, born 1 March 1957, is a senior Bureaucrat of Indian Civil Services. Neihsial was appointed as the 47th Controller General of Defence Accounts CGDA, Ministry of Defence, of the Republic of India. He was from 1981 the batch IDAS (Indian Defence Accounts Department) cadre. He served as Addl CGDA before his promotion to CGDA. He was earlier working as Principal controller (Northern Command) Jammu and Principal Financial Advisor to Indian Navy.After his superannuation as CGDA on 28-02-2017, he is appointed as administrative member of the Central Administrative Tribunal in 2018. Since 30 July 2018 he has been working as an administrative member of the Central Administrative Tribunal Bench in Guwahati, Assam.

See also
 Indian Defence Accounts Service

References

1957 births
Living people
Indian Civil Service (British India) officers
Indian government officials
Manipur University alumni